Exalphus spilonotus is a species of beetle in the family Cerambycidae. It was described by Restello in 2001.

References

Acanthoderini
Beetles described in 2001